Acorán Juan Hernández Mendoza (born  in Tenerife) is a Spanish male weightlifter, competing in the 62 kg category and representing Spain at international competitions. He competed at world championships, most recently at the 2011 World Weightlifting Championships.

Major results

See also
 Spanish records in Olympic weightlifting
 2011 World Weightlifting Championships – Men's 62 kg

References

External links
 
 
 Acoran Juan Hernandez Mendoza at Database Weightlifting 
 Acoran Juan Hernandez at Database Weightlifting 
 Acoran Hernandez at Database Weightlifting 
 

1990 births
Living people
Spanish male weightlifters
Place of birth missing (living people)
People from Tenerife
Sportspeople from the Province of Santa Cruz de Tenerife
European Weightlifting Championships medalists